Bolaños is a Hispanic surname. (Spanish for the plural "stone cannonballs" or "stoneshots") Notable people with the surname include:

Alex Bolaños (born 1985), Ecuadorian footballer
Christian Bolaños (born 1984), Costa Rican footballer
Enar Bolaños (born 1983), Costa Rican footballer
Enrique Bolaños (1928–2021), Nicaraguan politician, president 2002–2007
Hernán Bolaños (1912–1992), Costa Rican-Nicaraguan footballer
Horacio Gómez Bolaños (1930–1999), Mexican actor
Jonathan Bolaños (born 1978), Costa Rican footballer
Jorge Bolaños (born 1936), Cuban politician and diplomat
José Miguel Corrales Bolaños (born 1938), Costa Rican politician
Juan Carlos Bolaños (born 1946), Mexican racing driver
Luis Bolaños (born 1985), Ecuadorian footballer
Luis de Bolaños (c. 1540–1629), Spanish Franciscan friar and missionary evangelist
Meisi Bolaños (born 1970), Cuban politician
Miller Bolaños (born 1990), Ecuadorian footballer
Ronald Bolaños (born 1996), Cuban baseball player
Roberto Gómez Bolaños "Chespirito" (1929–2014), Mexican writer, actor, director, comedian

Spanish-language surnames